Phepheng, also known as Phepeng, Draaihoek or Draihoek, is a village in Kgalagadi District of Botswana. It is located north-east of the district capital Tshabong. The population was 994 in the 2011 census.

References

Kgalagadi District
Villages in Botswana